Bill Saffo is the Mayor of Wilmington, North Carolina.  He was appointed mayor in 2006 and reelected in 2007, 2009, 2011, 2013, 2015, 2017, 2019, and 2021.   He is the longest-serving mayor in the city's history.

Background 
The son of Greek immigrants, Saffo was born in Wilmington.

Political career

Saffo served on the Wilmington City Council from 2003 to 2007, and as Mayor since 2007.

Saffo was first elected to City Council in 2003.

During his first year in office he consolidated the city's water and sewer departments; initiated a review of the salaries of municipal employees - cautioning voters that fair salaries would require higher taxes; and began to investigate the economic potential of using revenue  from the State's hotel room tax to build a new convention center.  By 2009 construction on the new Convention Center was underway. the Convention Center opened in 2010, and is regarded as having been successful in expanding the city's convention and tourism business.

As Mayor, he helped to usher in the age of digital television on September 8, 2008 when Wilmington, North Carolina became the first town in the United States to switch over from the previous analog television platform.

References 

Living people
Year of birth missing (living people)
Mayors of places in North Carolina
Politicians from Wilmington, North Carolina
American people of Greek descent
University of North Carolina at Wilmington alumni
21st-century American politicians
North Carolina Democrats